David Recorbet (born October 24, 1976) is a retired French footballer who played as a defender.

External links

1976 births
Living people
Sportspeople from Clermont-Ferrand
Association football defenders
French footballers
AJ Auxerre players
FC Lorient players
INF Clairefontaine players
US Laon players
Wasquehal Football players
Footballers from Auvergne-Rhône-Alpes